The British Doctors' Study was a prospective cohort study which ran from 1951 to 2001, and in 1956 provided convincing statistical proof that tobacco smoking increased the risk of lung cancer.

Context
Although there had been suspicions of a link between smoking and various diseases, the evidence for this link had been largely circumstantial. In fact, smoking had been advertised as "healthy" for many years, and there had been no clear explanation why rates of lung cancer had soared.

To further investigate the link, the Medical Research Council (MRC) instructed its Statistical Research Unit (later the Oxford-based Clinical Trial Service Unit) to conduct a prospective study into the link. This approach to medical questions was fairly new: in the 1954 "Preliminary report", the researchers felt it necessary to offer a definition of the prospective principle.

The study, when it was published in 1956, heralded a new type of scientific research, showed the relevance of epidemiology and medical statistics in questions of public health, and vitally linked tobacco smoking to a number of serious diseases.

The study
In October 1951, the researchers wrote to all registered physicians in the United Kingdom, and obtained responses in two-thirds, 40,701 of them. No further cohorts were recruited.  Because of the limited sample size females were excluded from most analyses and publications focused on the male physicians.

The respondents were stratified into decade of birth, sex and their cause-specific mortality, as well as general physical health and current smoking habits, followed up in further questionnaires in 1957, 1966, 1971, 1978, 1991 and finally in 2001.

Statistical analysis
Response rates were quite high, making appropriate statistical analyses possible. The result was, that both lung cancer and "coronary thrombosis" (the then-prevalent term for myocardial infarction, now commonly referred to as "heart attack") occurred markedly more often in smokers.

In the follow-up reports, published every ten years, more information became available. A major conclusion of the study is, for example, that smoking decreases life span up to 10 years, and that more than 50% of all smokers die of a disease known to be smoking-related, although the excess mortality depends on amount of smoking, specifically, on average, those who smoke until age 30 have no excess mortality, those who smoke until age 40 lose 1 year, those who smoke until 50 lose 4 years, and those who smoke until age 60 lose 7 years.

Impact and personalities
The true impact of the study is difficult to gauge, as smoking was not considered a public health problem in the 1950s, and the appreciation of the problem would only grow in the ensuing decades. Nevertheless, the British Doctors' Study was to provide conclusive evidence of linkage between smoking and lung cancer, myocardial infarction, respiratory disease and other smoking-related illnesses.

The original study was run by Richard Doll and Austin Bradford Hill. Richard Peto joined the team in 1971 and would, with Doll, prepare all subsequent reports for publication. Doll and Peto are both celebrated epidemiologists, and their fame is largely based on their pioneering work in the study mentioned. They would continue their work on other cardiovascular studies, for example the more recent Heart Protection Study.

See also
 Framingham Heart Study
 Scandinavian Simvastatin Survival Study
 Nurses' Health Study
 Smoking in the United Kingdom
 History of cancer

References

British medical research
Clinical trials related to cancer
Cohort studies
Epidemiological study projects
Health effects of tobacco
Lung cancer
Medical Research Council (United Kingdom)
Smoking in the United Kingdom